Ännikse Nature Reserve is a nature reserve which is located in Pärnu County, Estonia.

The protected area was founded in 2007 to protect biodiversity in Ännikse, Rauksi and Koeri village (all in Varbla Parish).

References

Nature reserves in Estonia
Geography of Pärnu County